Atsina Lake is in Glacier National Park in the U. S. state of Montana, just to the west of Pyramid Peak. Atsina Lake has several waterfalls nearby including Paiota Falls, Atsina Falls and the Mokowanis Cascade.

See also
 List of lakes in Glacier County, Montana

References

Lakes of Glacier National Park (U.S.)
Lakes of Glacier County, Montana